Sodus Point Light is a lighthouse that was built on Sodus Point on Lake Ontario, New York.  The lighthouse has been replaced by a modern skeleton tower.  The lighthouse tower is a square, pyramidal cast iron tower on a concrete and stone pier.  It is white with red trim.  There is a 2 story limestone keepers quarters that was built in 1871, which is currently used as a museum.  The lighthouse is owned by the Village of Sodus Point, New York.  There is a long-term lease with the Sodus Bay Historical Society to manage the lighthouse.  The lighthouse is on the National Register of Historic Places, with reference #76001288, as Sodus Point Lighthouse.  The pier and shore light served simultaneously from 1834 until 1901.  The dwelling was used by the Coast Guard as housing until 1984.  There is a 3 order Fresnel lens on display.

References

External links

Sodus Bay Lighthouse Museum
Sodus Bay Lighthouse at American Byways

Lighthouses completed in 1825
Lighthouses completed in 1871
Houses completed in 1871
Lighthouses on the National Register of Historic Places in New York (state)
Lighthouse museums in New York (state)
Museums in Wayne County, New York
1825 establishments in New York (state)
National Register of Historic Places in Wayne County, New York
Buildings and structures in Wayne County, New York
Transportation in Wayne County, New York
Lighthouses of the Great Lakes